Pokharaira is a village in Muzaffarpur, Muzaffarpur, in the Indian state of Bihar.

Population 
In 2001, the population was 10,865. It is estimated that 97% are Hindu and 3% Muslim. The literacy rate is 64%, including 38.94% female and 66.51% male.

Climate 
The climate is semi-tropical monsoon. The months of May to June are hot and December to January are cold.

Crops 
The village has many Litchi and Mango plantations.

Utilities 
Electricity and potable water are available from private firms and mostly hand pumps.

Places of interest 
Visitors explore Narsingh Sthan and the Kanu temple of Palwaiya Dham and mine block.

Transport 
There is no public transportation in the village.

Education 
The state operates a teacher training School. The government operates RPS Government 10+2 School, three primary schools and two middle schools.

Health Centre 
A primary health center and hospital are there.

References 
 

Villages in Muzaffarpur district